Specifier may refer to:

 Specifier (linguistics), the sister node of an X' category
 Specifier (psychology), a diagnostic to specify a mental disorder or illness